Juho-Tuomas Appel (born January 23, 1983) is a Finnish former professional ice hockey forward.

Appel began his career with Kärpät and played 13 regular games in the SM-liiga for the team over two seasons between 2001 and 2003. He also played in Mestis for Hokki, KooKoo and Sport between 2003 and 2008. In 2010, Appel joined French Division 1 side Bisons de Neuilly-sur-Marne, helping them earn promotion to the Ligue Magnus that season with 12 goals and 38 assists for 50 points in 26 games. He re-signed for a second season with the Bisons but it proved to be a disappointment for Appel however as he only managed just one goal and eleven assists in 22 games. At the season's conclusion, Appel retired from hockey.

References

External links

1983 births
Living people
Bisons de Neuilly-sur-Marne players
Finnish ice hockey forwards
Hokki players
Kiekko-Laser players
KooKoo players
Oulun Kärpät players
People from Kristinestad
Rovaniemen Kiekko players
Vaasan Sport players
Finnish expatriate ice hockey players in France
Sportspeople from Ostrobothnia (region)